The Urban Counter-Terrorism Special Forces Group - Alpha, otherwise known as AFEUR or AFEAU is the army detachment of the elite AFEAU special operations group within the Colombian Armed Forces, dedicated to performing counter-terrorism operations, HVT acquisition or elimination, and hostage rescue.

The unit is also used for protection of VIPs. They protect the Colombian President when he travels, and provided protection for President Bill Clinton and President George W. Bush when they visited Cartagena in 2000 and 2004, respectively. They also provided the second security ring to President Bush's visit to Bogotá in 2007.

The full scope of this unit – and the operations it has been involved in – are both blacklisted. Some reports from Colombian media state that this unit has been involved in every top profile operation against guerrilla groups, in both preventive strikes and emergency response actions in urban and semi-urban areas all across Colombia, though details are kept in secret.

AFEUR answers directly to the General Command of the Armed Forces, and usually has carte blanche to use any available military air transportation, weapon, or equipment as required to accomplish their missions.

History
Due to terrorist acts conducted in cities by guerrilla groups, the Colombian Army needed a specially trained unit to deal with this threat. Such a unit's intended design would be to both operate and co-ordinate operations with other units of the army, and from other military branches.

Although Colombia's decades long conflict with guerrilla groups had given many reasons for such a unit to exist, two terrorist acts in particular worked as catalysts for the formation of the unit: the Dominican embassy siege in 1980, and the Palace of Justice siege in 1985.

In 2003, as the unit's experience grew, and its rate of success increased, the Colombian Government decided to establish and assign further units to main cities across the nation. Such units are smaller in size, and are trained and operated under a single entity by the name of AFEAU.

That same year, the Colombian Navy also deployed its own AFEUR unit attached to the Marine Corps. Although trained by the Army unit, the Navy unit specializes in underwater infiltration training akin to its amphibious nature. This unit is intended to have the same capabilities as its Army counterpart, and provide Special Forces support to other conventional Marine Corps units when operating in semi-urban areas.

Recruitment and training
Members of all branches of the Military of Colombia and the National Police are eligible to join AFEUR. Such personnel are required to have no criminal record, and are likely to have already received previous special operations training elsewhere, such as the Army’s Lancero course, or other training abroad.

Training takes place at the Army’s Communications School in Facatativá near Bogotá (which also serves as unit headquarters), and includes airborne operations, night operations, and close quarters combat. It is divided into two phases: the first phase focuses on teamwork buildup and training, whilst the second focuses on special skills training such as explosives handling, paramedic training, underwater operations, sharpshooting and marksmanship, amongst others depending on the specific AFEUR unit.

Commando Forces tournaments

AFEUR and associated AFEAU units have won the US-sponsored "Fuerzas Comando" (Commando Forces) contest nine times, in 2005, 2006, 2007, 2008, 2012, 2014, 2015, and 2016.

This yearly contest is sponsored by the US South Command and the US Special Operations Command, and is attended by similar teams from Argentina, Bolivia, Chile, Costa Rica, Ecuador, El Salvador, US, Guatemala, Honduras, Jamaica, Nicaragua, Panama, Paraguay, Dominican Republic, Peru and Uruguay.

Equipment
 IWI Tavor TAR-21
 Heckler & Koch MP5
 Colt M4
 Remington 700
 Galil ACE
 Remington MSR

References

Official website of the Colombian Army 
Official website of the General Command of the Armed Forces  
Colombian Team Wins Commando Forces 2005 
Colombian Team Wins Commando Forces 2006

External links
 AFEUR website 
 Colombia: Seguridad & Defensa - Unofficial Site 
 Video about AFEUR 

Counterterrorist organizations
Special forces of Colombia